Martin Madison (born in Winnebago County, Wisconsin in 1854) was a member of the South Dakota House of Representatives from 1903 to 1906. He was a Republican.

References

People from Winnebago County, Wisconsin
Republican Party members of the South Dakota House of Representatives
1854 births
Year of death missing